Rosema is a genus of tropical moths in the family Notodontidae described by Francis Walker in 1855.

Species
Species listed in alphabetical order:

 Rosema aethra Druce, 1887
 Rosema demorsa Felder, 1874
 Rosema deolis (Cramer, [1775])
 Rosema epigena (Stoll, [1790])
 Rosema falcata Druce, 1911
 Rosema zelica (Stoll, [1790])

References

External links
 
 

Notodontidae